4-Quinolone is an organic compound derived from quinoline.  It and 2-quinolone are the two most important parent (meaning simplified) quinolones.  4-Quinolone exists in equilibrium with a minor tautomer, 4-hydroxyquinoline (CAS#611-36-9).  Aside from pedagogical interest, 4-quinolone is of little intrinsic value but its derivatives, the 4-quinolone antibiotics, represent a large class of important drugs.

Synthesis
The chemical synthesis of quinolones often involves ring-closing reactions. Such reactions often install a hydroxyl group (an –OH functional group) on the carbon across from the ring nitrogen (i.e., the C-4 positions).  An example of such a synthesis is the Camps cyclization, which, depending on starting materials and reaction conditions, can give both 2-hydroxyquinolines (B) and 4-hydroxyquinolines (A) as shown.  The hydroxyquinolines tautomerize to the quinolones.

References